The term three-day fever may refer to
 Pappataci fever, a vector-borne arboviral infection
 Exanthema subitum, or the sixth disease, a childhood illness